Niagara, Ontario may refer to:

 Niagara-on-the-Lake, formerly called Niagara, a town that was at the mouth of the Niagara River
 Niagara Falls, Ontario, a city located adjacent to Niagara Falls
 Niagara Peninsula, a peninsula located between Lake Ontario and Lake Erie
 Regional Municipality of Niagara, also called Niagara Region, a regional municipality located on the Niagara Peninsula

See also 
 Niagara (disambiguation)